Beltrán Urenda Zegers (born 29 February 1920 – 22 June 2013) was a Chilean politician, lawyer and entrepreneur who served as Senator of the Republic of Chile from the return to the democracy on 11 March 1990 to 11 March 2002.

References

External links
 BCN Profile

1920 births
2013 deaths
Chilean people
20th-century Chilean politicians
21st-century Chilean politicians
Conservative Party (Chile) politicians
Traditionalist Conservative Party politicians
United Conservative Party (Chile) politicians
National Party (Chile, 1966) politicians
Independent Democratic Union politicians
Federico Santa María Technical University alumni
University of Valparaíso alumni